In the central and southern Appalachian Mountains of Eastern North America, a cove is a small valley between two ridge lines that is closed at one or both ends.

Among the places where the word "cove" appears in the name of an Appalachian valley are Morrison Cove in Pennsylvania; Lost Cove, North Carolina; Bumpass Cove, Tennessee; Doran Cove, Grassy Cove, Ladd Cove, in or adjacent to the Sequatchie Valley of Tennessee and Alabama; and numerous locations in the Great Smoky Mountains, including Cades Cove, Greenbrier Cove, Miller Cove, Tuckaleechee Cove, and Wears Cove. Burke's Garden in western Virginia is another example of a cove.

Limestone coves
Geologically, some coves are windows formed by erosion that penetrated through the overlying thrust sheet, exposing the younger limestone beneath. Cades Cove and Wears Cove in Tennessee are examples of limestone coves, in which fertile soils have formed on the limestone parent material in the valley bottoms.

Cove forest

Cove forest is the name for a type of deciduous forest community associated with Appalachian mountain coves. Cove forests, which are unique to the Appalachian Mountains and are a subtype of Appalachian-Blue Ridge forests, are found in protected positions in the landscape at middle to low elevations and are typified by high species richness of both plants and animals. Canopy species in this forest type include American basswood, tulip poplar, sugar maple, red maple, yellow birch, beech, white ash, bigleaf magnolia, bitternut hickory, and eastern hemlock. Carolina silverbell and eastern redbud are important understory trees. Notable flowering shrubs include rhododendron, flame azalea, and mountain laurel. Animals noted for their abundance and diversity in cove forest habitats include salamanders, birds, and small mammals.

The forest there is categorized into three subclasses. Dominant trees may include sugar maple, yellow buckeye, white ash, silverbell, or basswood, but yellow birch and beech are not dominant species. Bitternut hickory and northern red oak also may be common in the canopy. A defining feature of the rich montane association is the presence of lush herbaceous flora, including calciphilic plants whose presence indicates soils of neutral to alkaline pH (typically formed on limestone). Dominant canopy trees include yellow buckeye, white ash, basswood, cucumber-tree magnolia, tulip poplar, red maple, Eastern hemlock, and black birch. Typical subcanopy trees and shrubs include flowering dogwood, striped maple, sweetshrub, and rosebay rhododendron. In the third subclass, the typic foothills type, tulip poplar is the dominant species, but the canopy also may include basswood, white ash, mockernut hickory, yellow buckeye, silverbell, American beech, white oak, and red maple. Ferns are often common in the herbaceous layer. This subclass, found on protected sites at elevations mostly below , lacks species typical of higher elevation cove forests.

See also

Appalachian temperate rainforest

References

Valleys of the United States
Appalachian Mountains
Appalachian forests
Forest ecology